Thomas Jenkins was the headmaster of the King Edward VI Grammar School in Stratford-upon-Avon from 1575 to 1579. As such, his claim to fame is that William Shakespeare is considered likely to have been one of his students. No school records from the period survive; however, Jenkins is believed to have been of Welsh extraction, and a Welsh schoolmaster Sir Hugh Evans features in Shakespeare's play The Merry Wives of Windsor. Jenkins would have taught Shakespeare Latin grammar and literature. It has been speculated that Jenkins taught, and awakened in Shakespeare, an interest in the legendary history of the British Isles, and as such influenced Shakespeare to create plays featuring this material, such as King Lear and Cymbeline.

References

Bibliography

Welsh schoolteachers
16th-century births
Year of death unknown
16th-century English people
17th-century English people
Alumni of St John's College, Oxford